Miguel Borrego (born in Madrid, 1971) is a Spanish violinist. He serves together with Mariana Todorova Roeva as the concertmaster of the RTVE Symphony Orchestra and is a member of the Arbós Trio.

References

Spanish classical violinists
Male classical violinists
1971 births
Living people
People from Madrid
21st-century classical violinists
21st-century male musicians
Spanish male musicians